Dahesh may refer to:

Daheshism, a religion
Dr. Dahesh, real name Salim Moussa Achi, founder of Daheshism
Dahesh Museum of Art, a New York museum containing the collection of Dr. Dahesh